Internet Day is an event celebrated in Mexico, Peru, Chile, Paraguay, Argentina, Spain, Colombia, Uruguay, Ecuador, Bolivia, Venezuela, and other parts of the world on May 17, promoted by the Association of Internet Users.  It was celebrated for the first time on October 29, 2005.  Shortly afterwards, at the World Summit on the Information Society celebrated in Tunisia in November 2005, it was decided to propose to the UN the designation of May 17 as the World-wide Day of the Information Society, which resulted in Internet Day being celebrated on that day.

See also 
 Digital divide
 Digital rights
 Right to Internet access

References

External links 
 World-wide day of Internet

International observances
Internet culture
May observances